Shopify Inc. is a Canadian multinational e-commerce company headquartered in Ottawa, Ontario. Shopify is the name of its proprietary e-commerce platform for online stores and retail point-of-sale systems. The Shopify platform offers online retailers a suite of services including payments, marketing, shipping and customer engagement tools.

The company reported that it had more than 2,000,000 businesses in approximately 175 countries using its platform as of December 2021. According to BuiltWith, 1.58 million websites run on the Shopify platform as of 2021. According to W3Techs, 4.4% of the top 10 million websites use Shopify. The total gross merchandise volume exceeded US$197 billion for calendar 2022. As of July 2022, Shopify is among the top 20 largest publicly traded Canadian companies by market capitalization.

History

2006: Founding
Shopify was founded in 2006 by Tobias Lütke and Scott Lake after attempting to open Snowdevil, an online store for snowboarding equipment. Dissatisfied with the existing e-commerce products on the market, Lütke, a computer programmer by trade, instead built his own. Lütke used the open source web application framework Ruby on Rails to build Snowdevil's online store and launched it after two months of development. The Snowdevil founders launched the platform as Shopify in June 2006.
Shopify created an open-source template language called Liquid, which is written in Ruby and used since 2006.

In June 2009, Shopify launched an application programming interface (API) platform and App Store. The API allows developers to create applications for Shopify online stores and then sell them on the Shopify App Store.

2010s
In April 2010, Shopify launched a free mobile app on the Apple App Store. The app lets Shopify store owners view and manage their stores from iOS mobile devices. In 2010, Shopify started its Build-A-Business competition, in which participants create a business using its commerce platform. The winners of the competition receive cash prizes and mentorship from entrepreneurs, such as Richard Branson, Eric Ries and others. Shopify was named Ottawa's Fastest Growing Company by the Ottawa Business Journal in 2010. The company received $7 million from an initial series A round of venture capital financing in December 2010. Its Series B round raised $15 million in October 2011. In February 2012, Shopify acquired Select Start Studios Inc ("S3"), a mobile software developer, along with 20 of the company's mobile engineers and designers. In August 2013, Shopify acquired Jet Cooper, a 25-person design studio based in Toronto.

In August 2013, Shopify announced the launch of Shopify Payments partnership with Stripe. Shopify Payments allows merchants to accept payments without requiring a third party payment gateway. The company also announced the launch of an iPad-centric point of sale system. It uses an iPad to accept payments from debit cards and credit cards. The company received $100 million in Series C funding in December 2013. By 2014, the platform had hosted approximately 120,000 online retailers, and was listed as #3 in Deloitte’s Fast50 in Canada, as well as #7 in Deloitte’s Fast 500 of North America. Shopify earned $105 million in revenue in 2014, twice as much as it raised the previous year. In February 2014, Shopify released "Shopify Plus" for large e-commerce businesses with access to additional features and support.

On April 14, 2015, Shopify filed for an initial public offering (IPO) on the New York Stock Exchange and Toronto Stock Exchange under the symbols "SHOP" and "SH" respectively. Shopify went public on May 21, 2015, and in its debut on the New York Stock Exchange, started trading at $28, more than 60% higher than its US$17 offering price, with its IPO raising more than $131 million. In September 2015, Amazon.com announced it would be closing its Amazon Webstore service for merchants, and had selected Shopify as the preferred migration provider; Shopify's shares jumped more than 20% upon the news.

In April 2016, Shopify announced Shopify Capital, a cash advance product. Shopify Capital was initially piloted to merchants within the US and allowed merchants to receive an advance on future earnings processed through their payment gateway. Since its launch in 2016, Shopify Capital has provided over $2 billion in funding to Shopify merchants with a maximum advance of $2 million. On October 3, 2016, Shopify acquired Boltmade. In November 2016, Shopify partnered with Paystack which allowed Nigerian online retailers to accept payments from customers around the world. On November 22, 2016, Shopify launched Frenzy, a mobile app that improves flash sales. On December 5, 2016, Shopify acquired Toronto-based mobile product development studio Tiny Hearts. The Tiny Hearts building has been turned into a Shopify research and development office.

In January 2017, Shopify announced integration with Amazon that would allow merchants to sell on Amazon from their Shopify stores. Shopify's stock rose almost 10% upon this announcement. In April 2017, Shopify introduced a Bluetooth enabled debit and credit card reader for brick and mortar retail purchases. The company has since released additional technology for brick and mortar retailers, including a point-of-sale system with a Dock and Retail Stand similar to that offered by Square, and a tappable chip card reader.

Shopify announced a one-click checkout feature called Shopify Pay in April 2017 as an exclusive feature for merchants using Shopify Payments as their payment processor. Customers can save their shipping and payment information for future purchases on all participating Shopify stores. In November 2017 Shopify announced Arrive, an mobile application to help customers track their bought packages from both Shopify merchants and other e-commerce websites.

In September 2018, Shopify announced plans to locate thousands of employees in Toronto's King West neighborhood in 2022 as part of "The Well" complex, jointly owned by Allied Properties REIT and RioCan REIT. In October 2018, Shopify opened their first physical space in Los Angeles. The space offered classes, a "genius bar" for companies that use Shopify software and workshops. Online cannabis sales in Ontario used Shopify's software when the drug was legalized in October 2018.  Shopify's software is also used for in-person cannabis sales in Ontario since becoming legal in 2019.

In January 2019, Shopify announced the launch of Shopify Studios, a full-service television and film content and production house. On March 22, 2019, Shopify and email marketing platform Mailchimp ended an integration agreement over disputes involving customer privacy and data collection. In April 2019, Shopify announced an integration with Snapchat to allow Shopify merchants to buy and manage Snapchat Story ads directly on the Shopify platform. The company had previously secured similar integration partnerships with Facebook and Google.

In May 2019, Shopify acquired Handshake, a business-to-business e-commerce platform for wholesale goods. The Handshake team was integrated into Shopify Plus, and Handshake founder and CEO Glen Coates was made Director of Product for Shopify Plus. In June 2019, Shopify announced that it would launch its Fulfilment Network. The service promises to handle shipping logistics for merchants and will compete with an established leader, Amazon FBA. Shopify Fulfillment Network will be available to qualifying U.S. merchants in select states.

On August 14, 2019, Shopify launched Shopify Chat, a new native chat function that allows merchants to have real-time conversations with customers visiting Shopify stores online. On September 9, 2019, Shopify announced the acquisition of 6 River Systems, a Massachusetts-based company that makes warehouse robots. The acquisition was finalized in October, resulting in a cash-and-share deal worth US$450 million.

2020s
In 2020, the company announced new hires in Vancouver, Canada, and the effects of the COVID-19 pandemic contributed to lifting stock prices.

On February 21, 2020, Shopify announced plans to join the Diem Association, known as Libra Association at the time. On March 11, 2020, during the COVID-19 pandemic, Shopify announced it will shift its entire workforce to remote work.

In February 2020 Shopify Pay was rebranded as Shop Pay and in April 2020 Arrive was rebranded as Shop, combining both customer-facing features under a single brand.

It was reported that Shopify's valuation would likely rise on the back of options it had in the company Affirm that was expecting to go public shortly. In November 2020, Shopify announced a partnership with Alipay to support merchants with cross-border payments.

As a result of Affirm's January 13, 2021 IPO, Shopify's 8% stake in Affirm was worth $2 billion. About half of Shopify's C-level executives left the company in early 2021. On June 11, 2021, Shopify announced its acquisition of Primer, an AR app on the App Store that allows users to preview home improvement items digitally. On June 29, 2021, Shopify removed the 20% revenue share for app developers that make less than US$1 million per year.

On March 22, 2022, Shopify introduced Linkpop, a product to create a branded, social marketplace through which merchants can advertise and market their products via links to be added on social media channels. On April 11, 2022, Shopify announced their acquisition of Dovetale, an influencer marketing startup from New York. On January 18, 2022, Shopify announced a partnership with JD.com to let US merchants expand their operations in China, listing their products on JD’s cross-border e-commerce platform JD Worldwide.

On May 5, 2022, Shopify announced their acquisition of Deliverr, a San Francisco, California-based ecommerce fulfilment startup, for US$2.1 billion in cash and stock.

In June 2022, Shopify partnered with Twitter. As a part of the deal, Twitter announced that it would launch a sales channel app for all of Shopify’s U.S. merchants through its app store. Shopify also partnered with PayPal to offer Shopify Payments to merchants in France.

On July 26, 2022, Lütke announced immediate layoffs totalling roughly 10 percent of its workforce. In a message to employees, the CEO said the company's planning on growth rates continuing on the trajectory of the past two years "didn’t pay off" and forced the company to downsize. In August 2022, Shopify announced it was making e-commerce marketing automation platform Klaviyo the recommended email solution partner for its Shopify Plus merchant platform, with a US$100million strategic investment into the company.

Technology 

Shopify was initially built on Ruby on Rails in 2004, using a single mySQL instance. In 2014, Shopify introduced sharding to distribute Shopify to multiple databases. Over the years, Shopify has moved to pods, fully isolated instances.

Shopify's client side mainly uses Javascript execution.

Shopify allows independent developers to develop themes and apps on Shopify.

Esports 

In February 2021, Shopify announced that the company has formed an esports organization called Shopify Rebellion, and put together a professional StarCraft II team to compete in international tournaments. The team members include former 2016 world champion Byun Hyun-woo as well as Sasha Hostyn.

Last-mile logistics 
In April 2021, Shopify made its first entry in last-mile logistics by investing in Swyft, a Toronto-based digital logistics startup. As part of a Series A round of funding, a total of $17.5 million was raised for Swyft, co-led by Inovia Capital and Forerunner Ventures with participation from Shopify.

Criticism 

In 2017, the #DeleteShopify hashtag campaign called for a boycott of Shopify for allowing Breitbart News to host a shop on its platform. Shopify's CEO, Tobias Lütke, responded to the criticism, saying "refusing to do business with the site would constitute a violation of free speech".

In October 2017, Citron Research founder, short-seller Andrew Left released a report which claimed Shopify was overstating the amount of merchants using the e-commerce platform and described it as a "get-rich-quick" scheme in contravention of Federal Trade Commission regulations. The day the report was released, the stock plunged more than 11%. Left wrote another report about Shopify in April 2019, stating he believed Shopify's stock price would come down 50% in the next 12 months. In January 2020, Left announced in his annual letter to investors that Citron Research had exited the short position. The reports did not lead to an investigation into Shopify by the FTC.

In July 2022, Shopify was criticized by left-leaning media watchdog Media Matters for hosting the online store of far-right, anti-LGBT influencer Libs of TikTok. In response to Media Matters, a Shopify spokesperson stated that Libs of TikTok was not in violation of the company's Acceptable Use Policy, which "clearly outlines the activities that are not permitted on [the] platform." In November 2022, this criticism was renewed when an article published by the Canadian Broadcasting Corporation (CBC) article highlighted Ottawa City Council member Ariel Troster's criticism of the company in light of a recent shooting at an LGBTQ nightclub. Sharing the CBC article, Nandini Jammi of Check My Ads criticized Shopify on Twitter. In response to Jammi, CEO Tobias Lütke tweeted, "Shopify has a published acceptable use policy and a principled process to apply it. Pressure groups on all sides try to influence it sometimes and CBC needs to see through that not amplify bad faith narrative."

Legal affairs 
In December 2021, a group of publishers including Pearson Education, Inc., Macmillan Learning, Cengage Learning, Inc., Elsevier Inc., and McGraw Hill sued Shopify claiming that it had failed to remove listings and stores selling pirated copies of their books and learning materials.

Data breach 
In September 2020, Shopify confirmed a data breach in which customer data from fewer than 200 merchants was stolen. One of those merchants later said over 4,900 of their customers alone had had their information accessed. Shopify claims that the data stolen included names, addresses and order details, but not "complete payment card numbers or other sensitive personal or financial information." The company also claims that no evidence has proven that the data has been used. Shopify identified two "rogue members" of its support team to be responsible. The employees in question have been fired and the matter has been forwarded to the FBI.

See also
 Comparison of shopping cart software

References

External links 
 

 
	

2015 initial public offerings
Canadian brands
Canadian companies established in 2006
Companies based in Ottawa
Companies listed on the Toronto Stock Exchange
S&P/TSX 60
Internet properties established in 2006
Multinational companies headquartered in Canada
Point of sale companies
Retail companies established in 2006
Self-publishing companies
Self-publishing online stores
Web applications
Online marketplaces of Canada
E-commerce software